Pauly is a 1997 comedy television series.

Pauly may also refer to:

People
 Pauly (surname), list of people with the surname Pauly
 Pauly Shore (born 1968), American actor and comedian
 Pauly Burke (born 1974), American road racing cyclist
 Pauly D (born 1980), American television personality and disc jockey
 Pauly Falzoni, fictitious character in Australian film Fat Pizza
 Pauly Fuemana (1969–2010), New Zealand singer, songwriter and musician
 Pauly Thomaselli, ring name of American professional wrestler Brandon Thomas

Other uses
 Pauly, Ivory Coast, a coastal village in Bas-Sassandra District, Ivory Coast
 537 Pauly, an asteroid
 Realencyclopädie der classischen Altertumswissenschaft, also known as the "Pauly-Wissowa encyclopedia"
 Pauly Beds, one of the oldest bedding companies in the world

See also
 Pauley (disambiguation)
 Paul (disambiguation)
 Pearly (disambiguation)